The Legal Alliance for Reproductive Rights is a coalition of United States law firms offering free legal services to people seeking and providing abortions in the wake of Dobbs v. Jackson Women's Health Organization, which overruled Roe v. Wade. The group is led by San Francisco city attorney David Chiu. The group plans to provide pro bono representation to pregnant women and abortion providers facing civil suits and criminal charges related to seeking or providing abortions.

Participating law firms
Participating law firms include:

 Altshuler Berzon
 Arguedas Cassman Headley & Goldman
 Arnold & Porter
 BraunHagey & Borden
 Clarence Dyer & Cohen
 Conrad Metlitzky Kane
 Crowell & Moring
 Durie Tangri
 Farella Braun + Martel
 Glenn Agre Bergman & Fuentes
 Hanson Bridgett
 Keker Van Nest & Peters
 Lewis & Llewellyn
 Lieff Cabraser
 Heimann & Bernstein
 Moeel Lah Fakhoury
 Margolin, Allison B.
 Morrison & Foerster
 Nassiri & Jung
 Orrick, Herrington & Sutcliffe
 Paul, Weiss, Rifkind, Wharton & Garrison
 Ramsey & Ehrlich
 Rogers Joseph O'Donnell
 Swanson & McNamara
 Willkie Farr & Gallagher

References

Legal organizations based in the United States
Organizations established in 2022
Abortion-rights organizations in the United States